The 1969 Suisse Open Gstaad was a combined men's and women's professional tennis tournament played on outdoor clay courts in Gstaad, Switzerland. It was the 24thd edition of the tournament, the second in the Open Era, and was held from 22 July through 27 July 1969. Roy Emerson and Françoise Dürr won the singles titles.

Winners

Men's singles
 Roy Emerson defeated  Tom Okker 6–1, 12–14, 6–4, 6–4

Women's singles
 Françoise Dürr defeated  Rosie Casals 6–4, 4–6, 6–2

Men's doubles
 Tom Okker /  Marty Riessen defeated  Mal Anderson /  Roy Emerson 6–1, 6–4

Women's doubles
 Rosie Casals /  Billie Jean King defeated  Françoise Dürr /  Ann Jones 6–1, 6–3

References

External links
 Official website
 Association of Tennis Professionals (ATP) – Tournament profile
 International Tennis Federation (ITF) – Tournament details

Swiss Open (tennis)
Swiss Open Gstaad
Suisse Open Gstaad